is a short motorway in Hamburg, in north Germany. It connects the A 1 with the B 75 and B 4 at the Neue Elbbrücken (new Elbe bridge).

Exit list 

Neue Elbbrücken

|}

External links 

255
A255